The Wellington School (simply referred to as Wellington) is a PK–12 private, co-educational, college-preparatory school in Upper Arlington, Ohio, United States. It was established in 1982 by a group of entrepreneurs.

It is a member of the National Association of Independent Schools and Independent Schools Association of the Central States. It was named a Top Workplace by Columbus CEO magazine in 2013, 2014, 2015, 2016, and 2017. Wellington was also named Best Private School in the Best of Business poll by Columbus CEO magazine in 2015 and 2016. Head of School Robert Brisk presented at TEDxColumbus on the topic of student engagement in 2016.

Campus 
Wellington is located at the corner of Fishinger and Reed Roads in the center of Upper Arlington, Ohio approximately 8 miles from downtown Columbus, Ohio.

History 
Wellington was conceived in 1979 by a group of entrepreneurs with the goal of creating the first coeducational, independent school in Columbus. These entrepreneurs were Ken Ackerman, Harry K. Gard, Bob Holland, Len Immke, George Minot, Dave Swaddling, Dave Thomas, Jack Ruscilli, and Jeff Wilkins. They spent three years refining plans, raising money, finding a property, and recruiting teachers and students. In 1982, The Wellington School opened with 137 students and 19 employees as the first co-ed independent school in Columbus. The first graduating class was in 1989 with 32 students. In 2010, the new 76,000 square foot building opened. In 2012, the Little Jags preschool program for 3-year-olds began.

Athletics 
Wellington currently competes in the Mid-State League of the OHSAA Central Region athletic conferences. Sports at Wellington include: boys and girls soccer, tennis, golf, cross country, basketball, swim and dive, and track and field. Boys baseball and girls softball and lacrosse are also offered. 

Fall
 Boys soccer
 Girls soccer
 Girls tennis
 Boys Golf
 Girls Golf

Winter
 Boys basketball
 Girls basketball
 Swimming and diving

Spring
 Baseball
 Softball
 Boys lacrosse
 Girls lacrosse
 Boys tennis

Wellington Athletic Successes 

 2019 State Champions - Boys Soccer (Team) 
 2019 State Champions - Boys Tennis (Team)
 2018 State Champions - Boys Golf
 2018 State Champions - Boys Tennis (Team)
 2018 State Champions - Boys Tennis (Doubles)
 2018 State Runner-up - Boys Tennis (Individual)
 2017 State Qualifier - Boys Tennis (Individual)
 2017 State Qualifier - Boys Diving (Individual)
 2017 State Runner-Up - Boys Basketball
 2016 State Qualifier - Boys Tennis (Individual)
 2016 State Final Four - Boys Basketball
 2016 State Qualifier - Boys Diving (Individual)
 2016 State Runner-Up - Boys Tennis (Individual)
 2015 State Qualifier - Boys Diving (Individual)
 2015 State Qualifier - Boys Tennis (Individual)
 2014 State Runner-Up - Boys Golf
 2014 State Qualifier - Boys Golf (Individual)
 2014 State Qualifier - Girls Tennis (Individual)
 2014 State Qualifier - Boys Tennis (Individual)
 2014 State Qualifier - Boys Diving (Individual)
 2013 State Qualifier - Boys Golf
 2013 State Qualifier - Girls Tennis (Individual)

 2013 State Runner-Up - Girls Diving (Individual)
 2012 State Runner-Up - Boys Golf
 2012 State Runner-Up - Girls Diving (Individual)
 2011 State Champions - Boys Golf
 2011 State Runner-Up - Girls Golf (Individual)
 2011 State Runner-Up - Boys Tennis (Individual)
 2010 State Final Four - Girls Lacrosse
 2006 State Final Four - Girls Lacrosse
 2003 State Final Four - Boys Basketball
 2003 State Champions - Middle School Boys Lacrosse
 2001 State Champions - Boys Tennis (Doubles)
 2001 State Runner-Up - Boys Lacrosse
 2000 State Champions - Girls Lacrosse
 1999 State Runner-Up - Boys Lacrosse
 1998 State Runner-Up - Boys Lacrosse
 1989 State Champions - Girls Tennis (Doubles)

References

External links 
 

Middle schools in Franklin County, Ohio
High schools in Franklin County, Ohio
Private elementary schools in Ohio
Private middle schools in Ohio
Private high schools in Ohio
Preparatory schools in Ohio
Educational institutions established in 1982
1982 establishments in Ohio